John Edward King (10 July 1858 – 21 March 1939) was an author, Fellow and Tutor of Lincoln College, Oxford, High Master of Manchester Grammar School, Headmaster of Bedford School, and Headmaster of Clifton College.

Biography

Born in Ash, South Somerset, on 10 July 1858, John Edward King was educated at Clifton College and at Lincoln College, Oxford, where he was elected as a Fellow in 1882. He was assistant master at St Paul's School, between 1884 and 1887, tutor at Lincoln College, Oxford, between 1887 and 1891, high master of Manchester Grammar School, between 1891 and 1903, headmaster of Bedford School, between 1903 and 1910, and headmaster of Clifton College, between 1910 and 1923.

John Edward King died in Chilton Polden, Somerset, on 21 March 1939.

Publications

The Principles of Sound and Inflexion, as Illustrated in the Greek and Latin Languages, Oxford University Press, 1888
Comparative Grammar of Greek and Latin, Oxford University Press, 1890
Cicero, Tusculans, Loeb Classical Library, 1927
Bede's Ecclesiastical History, Loeb Classical Library, 1930
Inventory of Parochial Documents in the Diocese of Bath and Wells and the County of Somerset, 1938

References

1858 births
1939 deaths
People educated at Clifton College
Alumni of Lincoln College, Oxford
Fellows of Lincoln College, Oxford
High Masters of Manchester Grammar School
Headmasters of Bedford School
Headmasters of Clifton College
English male writers